The Peckwater Quadrangle (known as "Peck" to students) is one of the quadrangles of Christ Church, Oxford, England. It is a Grade I listed building.

Christ Church Library is on the south side of the quad. To the southeast is Canterbury Quadrangle, with access to Oriel Square via Canterbury Gate.

Peckwater Quad is on the site of a medieval inn, which was run by the Peckwater family and given to St Frideswide's Priory in 1246.

The buildings on the north, east and west sides of the Quadrangle were designed by Henry Aldrich and built by William Townesend between 1706 and 1711. They constitute one of the earliest examples of English neo-Palladian architecture. The Library, on the south side, dates from later in the 18th century. First floor rooms in this quad have traditionally been particularly sought after by undergraduate members of the college due to their size, oak panelling and high ceilings.  The largest examples of these rooms can be found in the corners of the building.

On 12 May 1894 and again on 20 February 1927, after dinner, Bullingdon Club members smashed almost all the glass of the lights and 468 windows in the quadrangle, along with the blinds and doors of the building.

Gallery

Panorama

See also
 Tom Quad
 Blue Boar Quadrangle
 Meadow Building
 Christ Church Library

References

Christ Church, Oxford
Grade I listed buildings in Oxford
Parks and open spaces in Oxford
Courtyards
Buildings and structures of the University of Oxford